Chen Xinren (November 7, 1915 – July 25, 2005) was a People's Republic of China diplomat. He was born in Puning County, Guangdong Province (now Puning City, Guangdong). He was ambassador of the People's Republic of China to Finland (1954–1958), the Philippines (1978–1981), Iran (1972–1974) and the Netherlands (January 1975 – July 1978).

1915 births
2005 deaths
Diplomats of the People's Republic of China
Ambassadors of China to the Netherlands
Ambassadors of China to Iran
Ambassadors of China to Finland
Ambassadors of China to the Philippines
Delegates to the 2nd National People's Congress
Delegates to the 3rd National People's Congress
People's Republic of China politicians from Guangdong
Politicians from Jieyang